The Tethys Ocean  ( Tēthús), also called the Tethys Sea or the Neo-Tethys, was a prehistoric ocean during much of the Mesozoic Era and early Cenozoic Era, located between the ancient continents of Gondwana and Laurasia, before the opening of the Indian and Atlantic oceans during the Cretaceous Period. 

It was preceded by the Paleo-Tethys Ocean, which lasted between the Cambrian and the Early Triassic, while the Neotethys formed during the Late Triassic and lasted until the early Eocene (about 50 million years ago) when it completely closed. A portion known as the Paratethys formed during the Late Jurassic, was isolated during the Oligocene (34 million years ago) and lasted up to the Pliocene (about 5 million years ago), when it largely dried out. The ocean basins of Europe and Western Asia, namely the Mediterranean Sea, Black Sea and Caspian Sea, are each remnants of the Paratethys Ocean.

Etymology
The sea was named after Tethys, who, in ancient Greek mythology, was a sea goddess, a sister and consort of Oceanus, mother of the Oceanid sea nymphs and of the world’s great rivers, lakes and fountains.

Terminology and subdivisions

The eastern part of the Tethys Ocean is sometimes referred to as Eastern Tethys. The western part of the Tethys Ocean is called Tethys Sea, Western Tethys Ocean, or Paratethys or Alpine Tethys Ocean. The Black, Caspian, and Aral seas are thought to be its crustal remains, though the Black Sea may, in fact, be a remnant of the older Paleo-Tethys Ocean. 
The Western Tethys was not simply a single open ocean. It covered many small plates, Cretaceous island arcs, and microcontinents. Many small oceanic basins (Valais Ocean, Piemont-Liguria Ocean, Meliata Ocean) were separated from each other by continental terranes on the Alboran, Iberian, and Apulian plates. The high sea level in the Mesozoic flooded most of these continental domains, forming shallow seas.

As theories have improved, scientists have extended the "Tethys" name to refer to three similar oceans that preceded it, separating the continental terranes: in Asia, the Paleo-Tethys (Devonian–Triassic), Meso-Tethys (late Early Permian–Late Cretaceous), and Ceno-Tethys (Late-Triassic–Cenozoic) are recognized. None of the Tethys oceans should be confused with the Rheic Ocean, which existed to the west of them in the Silurian Period. To the north of the Tethys, the then-land mass is called Angaraland and to the south of it, it is called Gondwanaland.

Modern theory

From the Ediacaran (600 ) into the Devonian (360 ), the Proto-Tethys Ocean existed and was situated between Baltica and Laurentia to the north and Gondwana to the south.

From the Silurian (440 ) through the Jurassic periods, the Paleo-Tethys Ocean existed between the Hunic terranes and Gondwana. Over a period of 400 million years, continental terranes intermittently separated from Gondwana in the Southern Hemisphere to migrate northward to form Asia in the Northern Hemisphere.

Triassic Period

About 250 Mya, during the Triassic, a new ocean began forming in the southern end of the Paleo-Tethys Ocean. A rift formed along the northern continental shelf of Southern Pangaea (Gondwana). Over the next 60 million years, that piece of shelf, known as Cimmeria, traveled north, pushing the floor of the Paleo-Tethys Ocean under the eastern end of northern Pangaea (early / proto- Laurasia). The Neo-Tethys Ocean formed between Cimmeria and Gondwana, directly over where the Paleo-Tethys formerly rested.

Jurassic Period
During the Jurassic period about 150 Mya, Cimmeria finally collided with Laurasia and stalled, so the ocean floor behind it buckled under, forming the Tethys Trench. Water levels rose, and the western Tethys shallowly covered significant portions of Europe, forming the first Tethys Sea. Around the same time, Laurasia and Gondwana began drifting apart, opening an extension of the Tethys Sea between them which today is the part of the Atlantic Ocean between the Mediterranean and the Caribbean. As North and South America were still attached to the rest of Laurasia and Gondwana, respectively, the Tethys Ocean in its widest extension was part of a continuous oceanic belt running around the Earth between about latitude 30°N and the Equator. Thus, ocean currents at the time around the Early Cretaceous ran very differently from the way they do today.

Late Cretaceous

Between the Jurassic and the Late Cretaceous, which started about 100  Mya, Gondwana began breaking up, pushing Africa and India north across the Tethys and opening up the Indian Ocean.

Cenozoic
Throughout the Cenozoic (66 million to the dawn of the Neogene, 23  Mya), a combination of the northern migration of Africa and global sea levels falling eventually led to the connections between the Atlantic and Indian Oceans across the Tethys being closed off in what is now the Middle East during the Miocene. This decoupling occurred in two steps, first around 20 Mya and another around 14 Mya.
During the Oligocene (33.9 to 23  Mya), large parts of central and eastern Europe were covered by a northern branch of the Tethys Ocean, called the Paratethys. The Paratethys was separated from the Tethys with the formation of the Alps, Carpathians, Dinarides, Taurus, and Elburz mountains during the Alpine orogeny. During the late Miocene, the Paratethys gradually disappeared, and became an isolated inland sea.

Historical theory

In Chapter 13 of his 1845 book, Roderick Murchison described a distinctive formation extending from the Black Sea to the Aral Sea in which the creatures differed from those of the purely marine period that preceded them. The Miocene deposits of Crimea and Taman, (south of the Sea of Azov) are identical with formations surrounding the present Caspian Sea, in which the univalves of freshwater origin, are associated with forms of Cardiacae and Mytili that are common to partially saline or brackish waters. This distinctive fauna has been found throughout all the enormously developed Tertiary formations of the southern and south-eastern steppes.

On the accompanying map, Murchison shows the Aralo-Caspian Formation extending from close to the Danube delta across Crimea, up the east side of the Volga river to Samara, then south of the Urals to beyond the Aral Sea. Brackish and upper freshwater components (OSM) of the Miocene are now known to extend through the North Alpine foreland basin and onto the Swabian Jura with thickness of up to 250m; these were deposited in the Paratethys when the Alpine front was still 100km farther south.

In 1885, the Austrian palaeontologist Melchior Neumayr deduced the existence of the Tethys Ocean from Mesozoic marine sediments and their distribution, calling his concept Zentrales Mittelmeer and described it as a Jurassic seaway, which extended from the Caribbean to the Himalayas.

In 1893, the Austrian geologist Eduard Suess proposed the hypothesis that an ancient and extinct inland sea had once existed between Laurasia and the continents which formed Gondwana II. He named it the Tethys Sea after the Greek sea goddess Tethys. He provided evidence for his theory using fossil records from the Alps and Africa. He proposed the concept of Tethys in his four-volume work Das Antlitz der Erde (The Face of the Earth).

In the following decades during the 20th century, "mobilist" geologists such as Uhlig (1911), Diener (1925), and Daque (1926) regarded Tethys as a large trough between two supercontinents which lasted from the late Palaeozoic until continental fragments derived from Gondwana obliterated it.

After World War II, Tethys was described as a triangular ocean with a wide eastern end.

From 1920s to the 1960s, "fixist" geologists, however, regarded Tethys as a composite trough, which evolved through a series of orogenic cycles. They used the terms 'Paleotethys', 'Mesotethys', and 'Neotethys' for the Caledonian, Variscan, and Alpine orogenies, respectively. In the 1970s and '80s, these terms and 'Proto-Tethys', were used in different senses by various authors, but the concept of a single ocean wedging into Pangea from the east, roughly where Suess first proposed it, remained.

In the 1960s, the theory of plate tectonics became established, and Suess's "sea" could clearly be seen to have been an ocean. Plate tectonics provided an explanation for the mechanism by which the former ocean disappeared: oceanic crust can subduct under continental crust.

Tethys was considered an oceanic plate by Smith (1971); Dewey, Pitman, Ryan and Bonnin (1973); Laubscher and Bernoulli (1973); and Bijou-Duval, Dercourt and Pichon (1977).

See also

References

Notes

Sources

External links
 

Historical oceans
Mesozoic paleogeography
Paleogene paleogeography
Permian paleogeography
Plate tectonics